Toliman or Tolimán may refer to:

The star Alpha Centauri B.
Tolimán (Jalisco), a town in the Mexican state of Jalisco.
Tolimán (Querétaro), a town in the Mexican state of Querétaro.
Volcán Tolimán, a stratovolcano in Guatemala.

See also
Tolima (disambiguation)
Tolman